South Highpoint is a census-designated place (CDP) in Pinellas County, Florida, United States. The population was 5,195 at the 2010 census.

Geography
South Highpoint is located at  (27.907596, -82.713878). Located within the unincorporated community of Highpoint, it is adjacent to the city of Largo.

Demographics

As of the census of 2000, there were 8,839 people, 2,136 households, and 1,386 families residing in the CDP.  The population density was 1,565.5/km (4,062.9/mi2).  There were 2,354 housing units at an average density of 416.9/km (1,082.0/mi2).  The racial makeup of the CDP was 67.96% White, 23.25% African American, 0.43% Native American, 3.62% Asian, 0.07% Pacific Islander, 2.92% from other races, and 1.75% from two or more races. Hispanic or Latino of any race were 9.27% of the population.

There were 2,136 households, out of which 37.1% had children under the age of 18 living with them, 38.7% were married couples living together, 19.9% had a female householder with no husband present, and 35.1% were non-families. 24.7% of all households were made up of individuals, and 4.4% had someone living alone who was 65 years of age or older.  The average household size was 2.64 and the average family size was 3.13.

In the CDP, the population was spread out, with 20.9% under the age of 18, 13.5% from 18 to 24, 43.9% from 25 to 44, 17.2% from 45 to 64, and 4.4% who were 65 years of age or older.  The median age was 32 years. For every 100 females, there were 165.1 males.  For every 100 females age 18 and over, there were 181.4 males.

The median income for a household in the CDP was $29,440, and the median income for a family was $30,136. Males had a median income of $25,000 versus $21,230 for females. The per capita income for the CDP was $9,519.  About 21.4% of families and 22.2% of the population were below the poverty line, including 34.5% of those under age 18 and 21.1% of those age 65 or over.

References

Census-designated places in Pinellas County, Florida
Census-designated places in Florida